Franz Wörmann (born 31 August 1939) is a German bobsledder. He competed in the two-man and the four-man events at the 1964 Winter Olympics.

References

1939 births
Living people
German male bobsledders
Olympic bobsledders of the United Team of Germany
Bobsledders at the 1964 Winter Olympics
Sportspeople from Garmisch-Partenkirchen